Zautbek Kausbekuly Turisbekov (Zauytbek Qauysbekūly Tūrysbektegı) is a Kazakh diplomat. From  to  he was Kazakh ambassador to Russia, presenting his credentials to Russian President Dmitry Medvedev on 16 December 2009.

References

Living people
Ambassadors of Kazakhstan to Russia
Ambassadors of Kazakhstan to Ukraine
1951 births